The 2019 West Suffolk District Council election was held on 2 May 2019 and was the inaugural election of the new West Suffolk District Council. It was held concurrently with other local elections across the United Kingdom.

The Conservative Party won 43 of the 64 seats and currently control the Council.

Summary

Election result

|-

Ward results

Abbeygate

Bardwell

Barningham

Barrow

Brandon Central

Brandon East

Brandon West

Chedburgh & Chevington

Clare, Hundon & Kedington

Eastgate

Exning

Haverhill Central

Haverhill East

Haverhill North

Haverhill South

Haverhill South East

Haverhill West

Horringer

Iceni

Ixworth

Kentford & Moulton

Lakenheath

Manor

Mildenhall Great Heath

Mildenhall Kingsway & Market

Mildenhall Queensway

Minden

Moreton Hall

Newmarket East

Newmarket North

Newmarket West

Pakenham & Troston

Risby

Rougham

Southgate

Stanton

St. Olaves

The Fornhams & Great Barton

The Rows

Tollgate

Westgate

Whepstead & Wickhambrook

Withersfield

By-elections

Newmarket North

Abbeygate

A by-election was called due to the resignation of Cllr Lisa Ingwall King.

 
 

 

No Liberal Democrat candidate as previous (20.3%).

Clare, Hundon and Kedington

Lakenheath

Moreton Hall

Southgate

Whepstead and Wickhambrook

The Rows

Horringer

References

West Suffolk District Council elections
West Suffolk
May 2019 events in the United Kingdom
2010s in Suffolk